John IV of Saxe-Lauenburg (c. 1483–1547) was a Prince-Bishop of Hildesheim.

Life
The son of Dorothea of Brandenburg and Duke John V of Saxe-Lauenburg (who is also known, confusingly, as John IV) stood for election as prince-archbishop of Bremen, however, the majority of the canons of the cathedral chapters of Bremen and Hamburg (with only three votes) elected Johann Rode archbishop on 30 January 1497. In 1503 John was elected as Prince-Bishop of Hildesheim, after his brother and predecessor in office, Eric, had resigned in his favour earlier the same year.

In 1504, following confirmation of his election by Pope Julius II, John took up office in the bishopric. On 28 January 1506 the bishop received agreement from the noble assembly (Ständeversammlung) to his raising of the Landbede, a tax.

Through his attempts to expand the territory of the prince-bishopric, he repeatedly clashed with the dukes of Brunswick-Lüneburg. Internally, too, there were conflicts with the town of Hildesheim and the self-assured bishopric nobles (Stiftsadel). The diocese of Hildesheim ran increasingly into debt.

John IV tried to consolidate prince-episcopal sovereignty into the Prince-Bishopric of Hildesheim again. Within a few years he was able to save enough to take back the castles and property pledged to the bishopric nobles. However, the latter refused to pay the redemption fees. Not until 1518 was John given the necessary regalia (rights) by Emperor Maximilian.

John IV was the central figure in the Hildesheim Diocesan Feud. Following his imperial ban, Bishop John of Hildesheim sought asylum with the Prince-Elector Joachim of Brandenburg and hoped in vain to be reinstated. In summer 1527 he resigned from office and went, freed from his ban, to become a canon at Ratzeburg in the homonymous prince-bishopric, where he died on 20 November 1547.

Ancestry

External links

Notes

John 04 Hildesheim
John 04 Hildesheim
John 04
1480s births
1547 deaths
16th-century bishops in the Holy Roman Empire
Sons of monarchs